Zelinja Gornja  is a village in the municipalities of Doboj (Republika Srpska) and Gradačac, Bosnia and Herzegovina.

Demographics 
According to the 2013 census, its population was 286, with all of them living in the Doboj part thus none in the Gradačac part.

References

Populated places in Gradačac
Populated places in Doboj